Corinne Serra Tosio (born 30 September 1965) is a French sports shooter. She competed in two events at the 1992 Summer Olympics.

References

External links
 

1965 births
Living people
French female sport shooters
Olympic shooters of France
Shooters at the 1992 Summer Olympics
Sportspeople from Aix-en-Provence